Derek Reilly (born c. 1947) is a former British professional ice hockey player. He played his entire playing career with the Murrayfield Racers between 1964 and 1984. He also played for the Great Britain national ice hockey team 19 times at three World Championships scoring 10 goals and five assists. He was inducted into the British Ice Hockey Hall of Fame in 1987.

External links

British Ice Hockey Hall of Fame entry

1947 births
British Ice Hockey Hall of Fame inductees
Scottish ice hockey left wingers
Date of birth missing (living people)
Murrayfield Racers players
Living people
Place of birth missing (living people)